This is a List of Cistercian monasteries (called abbeys) in Ireland. The first abbey built in Ireland was Mellifont Abbey, founded by Saint Malachy, Archbishop of Armagh in 1142.

Currently active abbeys
 Holy Cross Abbey, Tipperary, Ireland (restored)
 Mount Melleray Abbey, Co. Waterford, Ireland (Trappist)
 Mount St. Joseph Abbey, Roscrea, Ireland (Trappist) 
 Portglenone Abbey Church, County Antrim, Northern Ireland (Trappist) 
 Mellifont Abbey, Collon, Co. Louth, Ireland (Trappist) 
 Bolton Abbey, Moone, Co. Kildare, Ireland (Trappist) 
 St. Mary's Abbey, Glencairn, Co. Waterford, Ireland (Trappist); the only Cistercian Abbey for women in Ireland

Abbeys, now in ruins
 Abbeydorney Abbey (1154)
 Abbeyknockmoy Co. Galway (1190)
 Abbey of Lerha (1205)
 Baltinglass Abbey (1148)
 Bective Abbey (1147), Co. Meath, Ireland
 Boyle Abbey (1142)
 Corcomroe Abbey (estd. 1205-1210)
 Duiske Abbey, Graiguenamanagh (1204-1207)
 Dunbrody Abbey
 Grey Abbey (1193)
 Hore Abbey Adjacent to the Rock of Cashel (1270)
 Inch Abbey (1177)
 Jerpoint Abbey (1180)
 Kilbeggan Abbey (1150) 
 Kilcooly Abbey (1182)
 Mellifont Abbey (1142)
 Tintern Abbey (County Wexford)
 Tracton Abbey (1224) (Co. Cork)
 Abbey Leix (1183), Abbeyleix, Co Laois
Mainistir an Aonaigh (County Limerick) was founded in 1148 by Turlough O’Brien, King of Thomond.

Abbeys, No longer in existence 
 Comber Abbey (approx. 1200) 
 St. Mary's Monasterevin (Rosglas) (1189)

See also
List of Cistercian abbeys in Britain
List of abbeys and priories in Ireland
Cistercian Order

References

Sources

 
 

 
 
Cistercian abbeys
Lists of Christian monasteries in Ireland